Howard Kelly may refer to:

 Howard Kelly (Royal Navy officer) - (1873-1952) Royal Navy admiral
 Howard Atwood Kelly - (1858-1943) American gynecologist
 Howard Kelly (actor) - American actor